

Gmina Pilawa is an urban-rural gmina (administrative district) in Garwolin County, Masovian Voivodeship, in east-central Poland.

The gmina contains part of the protected area called Masovian Landscape Park.

Villages
Apart from the town of Pilawa, Gmina Pilawa contains the villages and settlements of Gocław, Jaźwiny, Kalonka, Lipówki, Łucznica, Niesadna, Niesadna-Przecinka, Puznówka, Trąbki, Wygoda and Żelazna.

Neighbouring gminas
Gmina Pilawa is bordered by the gminas of Garwolin, Kołbiel, Osieck, Parysów and Siennica.

References
 

Pilawa
Garwolin County